Intrigue and Love is a 1959 East German historical drama film directed by Martin Hellberg and starring Wolf Kaiser, Otto Mellies and Marion Van de Kamp. The film was made by the East German state-owned DEFA studio. It is an adaptation of Friedrich Schiller's 1784 play Intrigue and Love.

The film's sets were designed by the art director Harald Horn.

Plot
Ferdinand is an army major and son of President von Walter, while Luise Miller is the daughter of a middle-class musician. They fall in love with each other, but both their fathers urge them to end the affair.

Cast
 Wolf Kaiser as Präsident von Walter
 Otto Mellies as Ferdinand, sein Sohn
 Marion Van de Kamp as Lady Milford
 Willi Schwabe as Hofmarschall von Kalb
 Martin Hellberg as Miller, Stadtmusikant
 Marianne Wünscher as seine Frau
 Karola Ebeling as Luise, seine Tochter
 Uwe-Jens Pape as Wurm, Haussekretär des Präsidenten
 Hans Finohr as Kammerdiener
 Christine Schwarze as Sophie, Kammerjungfer
 Waltraud Backmann as Hofdame
 Fredy Barten as 1. Hofherr
 Hildegard Distelmann as Witwe
 Wilhelm Otto Eckhardt as Minister und Hofherr
 Hans Feldner
 Horst Giese as Rebell
 Max Klingberg as Gefängniswärter
 Sepp Klose as 1. Reiterknecht
 Otto Krone as Geheimer
 Alexander Papendiek as Rebell
 Linde Sommer
 Doris Thalmer
 Nico Turoff as Hofherr
 Ilse Voigt as Bürgerin
 Lisa Wehn as Alte Frau

References

Bibliography 
 Goble, Alan. The Complete Index to Literary Sources in Film. Walter de Gruyter, 1999.

External links 
 

1959 films
1950s historical drama films
German historical drama films
East German films
1950s German-language films
Films set in the 18th century
German films based on plays
Films based on works by Friedrich Schiller
1959 drama films
1950s German films